Tabeer (English: Interpretation) is a Pakistani television series created by Momina Duraid under MD Productions and premiered on Hum TV on 20 February 2018. It stars Iqra Aziz and Shehzad Sheikh. It is directed by Ahson Talish and written by Imran Ashraf.

The drama is the third on-screen collaboration between Shehzad Sheikh and Iqra Aziz after Choti Si Zindagi and  Qurban and between Imran Ashraf and Eshal Fayyaz after Abro.

A dubbed version of the serial in Pashto was aired on Hum Pashto 1.

Plot

Tabeer (Iqra Aziz) is pregnant with her husband Yasir's child. Yasir (Imran Ashraf) works for Fawad. Fawad's mother is somewhat arrogant, but Fawad (Shehzad Sheikh) is a very generous and simple man. Fawad is married to Zarnish (Eshal Fayyaz) who gives birth to his child but dies of cancer. Yasir also dies in a car accident. Tabeer is in great shock and later gives birth to Yasir's son, who also dies later because of Ajju's (Ali Safina) carelessness.

Sania (Hajra Yameen) is a very emotional character who loved Fawad madly but is depressed after being rejected. To lessen her pain, she joins a school where she meets a painter (Ahson Talish) who is also emotional after losing his wife. He starts to love Sania secretly.

Tabeer feeds Fawad's child and after a series of ups and downs in her life Fawad marries her secretly in her house by the approval of Daadi (Azra Mansoor). Meanwhile, Fawad's mother takes his proposal of marriage to Sania's house without his approval. After finding out, he calls Sania and tells her about his marriage to Tabeer. Sania's heart is broken again and she goes to her best friend the painter's house, but when she discovers that he left for London she panics and accidentally falls into a swimming pool. She is admitted to the hospital in serious condition.

Fawad's brother (Raza Talish) returns from abroad and starts to take interest in Tabeer without knowing that she is his sister-in-law. After finding out, he grabs a pistol and tries to kill himself. Fawad tries to save him, but in the attempt is shot in the chest. Finally, after much drama he is saved and Fawad's mother happily accepts Tabeer. Sania is proposed to by the painter and she accepts readily.

Seven years later, Tabeer is happy and living with Fawad and his child.

Cast 
 Shehzad Sheikh as Fawad
 Iqra Aziz as Tabeer
 Imran Ashraf as Yasir
 Eshal Fayyaz as Zarnish
 Mizna Waqas as Muskaan
Raza Talish as Shehryar
Ali Safina as Ajju
 Bee Gul
 Zainab Ahmed as Asma
 Azra Mansoor as Daadi
 Aamir Qureshi as Rafaqat
 Seemi Pasha as Shehryar and Fawad's mother
 Annie Zaidi as Asma (Zarnish's mother)
 Hajra Yamin as Sania
 Khalid Shaheen as Zarnish's father
 Shah Saleem
 Malik Raza as Khalid
 Falak as Khalid's son
 Kunaan Chaudhry
 Ayesha Khan Jr.
 Ahson Talish as the painter (Sania's husband)
 Saima Kanwal
 Nabeela Kanwal
 Ahmad Bashir
 Malik Tanveer
 Naseer Dar
 Masooma Jaffry
 Mohsin

Awards and nominations

See also 
 List of programs broadcast by Hum TV

References

External links 

2018 Pakistani television series debuts
Hum TV original programming
Pakistani drama television series
Urdu-language television shows